The Academy of Fine Arts, Prague (AVU) is an art college in Prague, Czech Republic. Founded in 1799, it is the oldest art college in the country. The school offers twelve master's degree programs and one doctoral program.

History
Starting in the early 18th century a series of organizations were formed in Prague with an interest in promoting art and education. Thanks in part to their efforts, the Academy of Fine Arts was founded by Imperial Decree on September 10, 1799. It began with instruction in drawing. The academy was gradually expanded to include programs in architecture, painting, printmaking, and sculpture, among others. In 1990 drastic reforms were undertaken by rector Milan Knížák to reorganize the concept and internal structure of the school. By 1991 new media related study programs including film and computer animation were added.

Today
Today the academy is an accredited university offering an education in modern and historic art. As an exclusively graduate school there are no student accommodation or on-campus eating facilities. International programs are offered in Czech, with a limited number of classes offered in English.

Departments
Current departments include:
 Painting
 Drawing and Printmaking
 Sculpture
 Intermedia Studies
 New Media
 Restoration of Artworks
 Architecture

References

 
Art schools in the Czech Republic
1799 establishments in the Holy Roman Empire
1799 establishments in the Habsburg monarchy
18th-century establishments in Bohemia
Educational institutions established in 1799
Educational institutions in Prague